Robert Aiken was one of Robert Burns's closest friends and greatest admirers. He was born in 1739 in Ayr, Scotland. His father John Aiken, was a sea captain who owned his own ships and his mother was Sarah Dalrymple, distantly related to the Dalrymples of Stair. He became a writer or lawyer in Ayr and was referred to by Burns as "Orator Bob" in his poem "The Kirk's Alarm". Robert was famous for the power, beauty and quality of his oratory as his nickname infers.

Life and character
Robert was a prosperous and convivial individual, small in stature and rotund. He married Janet Hunter on 25 March 1771. She died on 17 October 1815 and is buried with her husband, who died aged 78 in 1807, in the Auld Kirk graveyard, Ayr. He was a cousin to the Earl of Glencairn and as stated had links with the Dalrymple family of Stair.

As stated Robert was famous for his powers of oratory and Burns gave him the nickname Orator Bob in "The Kirk's Alarm":

Aiken was a member of the committee of the Ayr Library Society, which allowed subscribers access to the latest books published. As an officer of the society he was one of those who burned Thomas Paine’s works under government orders.

The Aiken family memorial at the Auld Kirk in Ayr was renewed in 1919 by the Ayr Burns Club and restored by the Robert Burns World Federation in 1960 as recorded on the monument. The A.H.Aiken mentioned several times was his son Andrew Hunter Aiken.

Association with Robert Burns
Robert is thought to have first met Burns in 1783. Burns commented that until he had heard Robert Aiken reading his poetry aloud he had failed to fully appreciate it. In letters to their mutual friend John Ballantyne that year, he describes Aiken as his "first poetic patron" and "first kind patron".

In a letter to Robert Aiken in December 1786 Burns refers to him as "Dear Patron of my Virgin Muse" and that has been interpreted as infering that he may have been an intermediary in Burns's introduction to William Smellie and William Creech, his printer and publisher for the Poems, Chiefly in the Scottish Dialect (Edinburgh Edition). He had previously collected nearly a quarter (145 copies) of all subscriptions for Burns's Kilmarnock Edition.

Burn's wrote that "I have found Creech, who is my agent forsooth, and Mr Smellie who is to be my printer, that honor and goodness of heart which I always expected in Mr Aiken's friends."

In February 1786 he wrote to his friend John Richmond saying "My chief patron is Mr Aiken in Ayr who is pleased to express great approbation of my works".

"The Cotter's Saturday Night" first published in the Kilmarnock Edition of 1786 was dedicated to Aiken by Burns and in the first verse he compliments his friend: 

"Holy Willie's Prayer" was inspired by Robert Aiken's "Glib-tongued Aiken's" successful defence of Gavin Hamilton in the summer of 1785 before the Presbytery of Ayr and the Synod in a dispute with the Rev. William Auld and the Kirk Session.

Burns expressed his admiration for his friend in the following "Epitaph for Robert Aiken Esq";

Robert Aiken was Surveyor of Taxes and it is through him in 1786 that we have a list of the carriages, riding-horses, wives, servants, children, etc. in the Burns family farm at Mossgiel.

Aiken's daughter Grace stated that a clerk in her father's legal office lost or possibly stole most of the letters that Burns had written to him, with only seven surviving, including one from October 1786 that contains Burns's first thoughts on joining the excise service.

Robert Aiken may have approached Patrick Douglas of Garallan regarding Burns's wish to emigrate to Jamaica, what is certain is that he was offered a job as a book-keeper on Douglas's plantation near Port Antonio.

Aiken took a keen interest in the Alloway Burns Club. The first Immortal Memory was written by Hamilton Paul who was asked by Aiken to meet him before the first Burns Supper of July 1801: "The Club was to dine in Burns’s Cottage. Mr Aiken and I took a walk before dinner towards Allowa Kirk. He requested me to show him the ode which I had prepared for the occasion. He read a verse or two and walked a few paces without speaking – at last he said with great emotion – in a flattering tone – ‘That will do – there are two Criteria by which I judge of the merit of a production of this kind. First my eyes are suffused – next the button of my waistcoat skelps.’ He was dressed in a Brown coat and a snow white vest which actually burst open".

He both chaired or simply attended the club's 'Burns Suppers' until his death in 1807 and Hamilton Paul recounted the following at the 1808 supper:

Epistle to a Young Friend 

The "Epistle to a Young Friend" was written by Robert Burns for Andrew Hunter Aiken, Robert Aiken's eldest son. The poem inspired General Sam Houston and he wrote to his son saying that "I would commend to your particular attention a poem of Burns. It is his advice to a young friend, Andrew. I have found it one of the most salutary as well as one of the safest guides I have met with in life".

Andrew's eldest son, Peter, owned the original holograph of Burns's "The Cotter's Saturday Night" and chaired the 1859 Robert Burns celebrations in Bristol.

Robert Aiken and Burns's marriage to Jean Armour
James Armour went to Robert Aiken on the 15 April 1786 in order to try and annul the irregular but valid marriage of Jean Armour and Robert Burns. James probably did not approach a lawyer in Mauchline as Gavin Hamilton and his partner and brother were New Licht and James was a staunch Auld Licht. Some reports suggest that the marriage paper was held by Robert Aiken, however the earliest records state that it was in the possession of Jean Armour herself. It is said that to appease Jean's father he cut the names of the couple from the marriage document although this would probably not have altered the situation in the eyes of the law.

Burns wrote to Gavin Hamilton regarding the incident saying: "I must consult you, first opportunity, on the propriety of sending my quondam friend, Mr Aiken, a copy. If he is now reconciled to my character as an honest man, I would do it with all my soul; but I would not be beholden to the noblest being ever God created, if he imagined me to be a rascal."

He went on to detail James Armour's actions: "Apropos, old Mr Armour prevailed with him to mutilate that unlucky paper, yesterday. Would you believe it? tho' I had not a hope, nor even a wish, to make her mine after her conduct; yet when he told me, the names were all cut out of the paper, my heart died within me, and he cut my very veins with the news."

In conclusion he goes on to express his feelings regarding Jean Armour's actions; "Perdition seize her falsehood, and perjurious perfidy! but God bless her and forgive my poor, once-dear, misguided girl. She is ill-advised. do not despise me, Sir: I am indeed a fool, but a "knave" is an infinitely worse character than any body, I hope, will dare to give, the unfortunate Robt Burns".

The letter does not suggest any lasting bad feeling between Burns and Aiken, only a hope that Aiken did not think ill of him under the circumstances and remains his friend. Robert's grandson published a book of 'Memorials to Robert Burns' in which he refuted any breakdown of his grandfather's friendship with Burns and refuted the accusations of his connivance with James Armour over the marriage document.

In 1788 Robert and Jean were finally legally married however Burns was surprisingly reticent about it. Gavin Hamilton's eldest daughter Jacobina or 'Beennie' recollected, how even she only became aware of the marriage at breakfast one day when Burns and Robert Aiken were present and upon apologising to Robert Aiken for the lack of his usual boiled egg Burns said "if she cared to send over the way to Mrs Burns she might have some".

See also

Lesley Baillie
John Ballantine
Alison Begbie
Nelly Blair
Isabella Burns
May Cameron
Mary Campbell (Highland Mary)
Jenny Clow
Gavin Hamilton 
Helen Hyslop
Nelly Kilpatrick
Jessie Lewars
John McMurdo
Anne Rankine
Isabella Steven
Peggy Thompson

References
Notes

Further reading

 Begg, Robert Burns (1891). Memoir of Isobel Burns. Privately published.
 Brown, Hilton (1949). There was a Lad. London : Hamish Hamilton.
 Douglas, William Scott (Edit.) 1938. The Kilmarnock Edition of the Poetical Works of Robert Burns. Glasgow : The Scottish Daily Express.
 Hecht, Hans (1936). Robert Burns. The Man and His Work. London : William Hodge.
 Hill, John C. Rev. (1961). The Love Songs and Heroines of Robert Burns. London : J. M. Dent.
 Mackay, James (2004). Burns. A Biography of Robert Burns. Darvel : Alloway Publishing. .
 McIntyre, Ian (2001). Robert Burns. A Life. New York : Welcome Rain Publishers. .
 McQueen, Colin Hunter (2008). Hunter's Illustrated History of the Family, Friends and Contemporaries of Robert Burns. Messsrs Hunter McQueen & Hunter. 
 Purdie, David, McCue & Carruthers, G (2013). Maurice Lindsay's The Burns Encyclopaedia. London : Robert Hale. 
 Westwood, Peter J. (1996). Jean Armour. Mrs Robert Burns. An illustrated Biography.  Dumfries : Creedon Publications. ISBN

External links
Researching the Life and Times of Robert Burns Researcher's site.

Robert Burns
1739 births
1807 deaths
People from Ayr
People of the Scottish Enlightenment